South Carolina Highway 823 (SC 823) is a  state highway in McCormick and Abbeville counties in South Carolina, United States. The highway connects Mount Carmel with rural areas of McCormick and Abbeville counties.

Route description

SC 823 begins at an intersection with SC 81 (Main Street) in Mount Carmel, within McCormick County. It travels to the north-northeast and immediately curves to the northeast along the western edge of Sumter National Forest. It crosses over Lott Creek, and then curves to the east-southeast and leaves Mount Carmel and enters the forest proper for a very short distance. It immediately crosses over the Little River. When it curves to the northeast, it again travels along the western edge of the forest. The highway curves to the north and crosses Hartzog Branch. It heads to the northeast again for a short time and enters Abbeville County. Right after the county line, SC 823 crosses over Bowie Branch and White Creek. It heads to the north-northeast and curves to the northeast. It passes Lebanon Cemetery. It then meets its northern terminus, an intersection with SC 72 at a point southwest of Abbeville.

Major intersections

See also

References

External links

 SC 823 at Virginia Highways' South Carolina Highways Annex

823
Transportation in McCormick County, South Carolina
Transportation in Abbeville County, South Carolina